A thromde (Dzongkha: ཁྲོམ་སྡེ་; Wylie: khrom-sde) is a second-level administrative division in Bhutan. The legal administrative status of thromdes was most recently codified under the Local Government Act of 2009, and the role of thromdes in elections in Bhutan was defined in the Election Act of 2008

Governance

Thromde administration is a product of the Bhutanese program of decentralization and devolution of power and authority. Thromdes are administered independently by a Thromde Tshogde if sufficiently developed and populated (Class A Thromdes); or directly by Dzongkhag Administration or the Gewog Administration as decided by the Government (Class B Thromdes and Yenlag Thromdes). From time to time, Parliament decides the boundaries of Thromde in consultation with the National Land Commission Secretariat and local authorities.

Each Thromde Tshogde is composed of seven to ten elected members and headed by a Thrompon. Thromde Tshogdes are empowered to regulate advertising, enforce public health and safety rules, and to levy taxes on land, property, property transfer (sales tax) and, "betterment." The municipal governments are also authorized to levy special taxes on vacant and underdeveloped land to encourage development, and to raise and spend money in to promote local economic development.

The administrations overseeing Class B Thromdes and Yenlag Thromdes are tasked with encouraging and overseeing their progressive development into Class A Thromdes – locally governed municipalities.

Although Class A and Class B Thromdes were established ahead of local elections in 2011, Yenlag Thromdes were to be declared only after the second parliamentary elections in 2013. This would be followed by another delimitation of the 16 Dzongkhag Thromdes (Class B) and a review of chiwog numbers and boundaries affected by the declaration of the Yenlag Thromdes. In 2015 a list was approved by parliament of updated Dzongkhag and Yenlag Thromdes boundaries. As of 2017 there are only four self-governing Thromde (Dzongkhag Thromde class A) : Thimphu, Phuentsholing, Gelephu and Samdrup Jongkhar.

History
Under the Geog Yargay Tshochung of 2002, gewog administration included non-votingTshogpa, representatives of villages or village clusters. Through the enactment of the Act of 2009, gewogs were divided administratively into representatives by chiwogs, or village groups.

The Local Government Act of 2007 was the first piece of Bhutanese legislation to provide distinctions among thromdes, dividing them into two classes: Dzongkhag Thromdes, which lacked the developmental capacity to form administrations in their own right; and Gyelong Thromdes, which were independent, non-legislating municipalities administered by a Gyelyong Thromde Tshogdu (Gyelyong administration). Each Gyelong administration was headed by an Executive Secretary. The administrative role of Gyelong Thromde Tshogdus were largely analogous to later roles for more developed municipalities.

The Constitution of 2008 confirmed the status of thromdes, providing for Thromde Tshogdes as the most basic level of some local government administration; for other thromdes, administration was provided directly through Dzongkhag Thromde representation by one elected member from Dzongkhag Thromdes, and a second from Dzongkhag Yenlag Thromdes. The Constitution provided the basic legal framework for thromde administrations in the terms that continue today.

List of Thromdes

The following is a list of thromdes by dzongkhag, gewog, and rank:

See also
Dzongkhag
Dungkhag
Gewog
Chiwog
Bhutanese legislation
Local Government Act of Bhutan 2009

References

 
Bhutan, Thromdes
Bhutan 3
Bhutan geography-related lists